The 1977 Taipei Summit Open was a men's tennis tournament played on indoor carpet courts in Taipei, Taiwanthat was part of the 1977 Colgate-Palmolive Grand Prix. It was the inaugural edition of the tournament and was held from 21 November through 26 November 1977. First-seeded Tim Gullikson won the singles title.

Finals

Singles
 Tim Gullikson defeated  Ismail El Shafei 6–7, 7–5, 7–6, 6–4
 It was Gullikson's 2nd singles title of the year and of his career.

Doubles
 Chris Delaney /  Pat DuPré defeated  Steve Docherty /  Tom Gorman 7–6, 7–6

References

External links
 ITF tournament edition details

Taipei Summit Open
Taipei Summit Open